NXT UK TakeOver: Blackpool was the inaugural NXT UK TakeOver professional wrestling livestreaming event produced by WWE. It was held exclusively for wrestlers from the promotion's NXT UK brand division. The event aired exclusively on the WWE Network and took place on 12 January 2019 at the Empress Ballroom in Blackpool, Lancashire, England. It was also the first event under a subseries of UK TakeOvers titled TakeOver: Blackpool.

Five matches were contested at the event. In the main event, Pete Dunne retained the WWE United Kingdom Championship against Joe Coffey in what would be his final successful title defence of his 685-day reign. After the match, Walter made his debut and attacked Coffey before having a stare-down with Dunne. Other matches included Zack Gibson and James Drake defeating Moustache Mountain to become the inaugural NXT UK Tag Team Champions, Toni Storm defeated Rhea Ripley to win the NXT UK Women's Championship, and Finn Bálor, who made a surprise appearance to replace an injured Travis Banks, defeating Jordan Devlin.

Production

Background 
TakeOver was a series of professional wrestling shows that began on 29 May 2014, when WWE's NXT brand held their second live special on the WWE Network. The NXT UK brand debuted in June 2018 and subsequently adopted the TakeOver name for their live WWE Network specials, beginning with NXT UK TakeOver: Blackpool, held on 12 January 2019 at the Empress Ballroom in Blackpool, Lancashire, England. Like with several of NXT's TakeOvers, the event was named after the city it was held in.

Storylines 

The card included five matches that resulted from scripted storylines. Wrestlers portrayed heroes, villains, or less distinguishable characters in scripted events that built tension and culminated in a wrestling match or series of matches. Results were predetermined by WWE's writers on the NXT UK brand, while storylines are produced on their weekly television programme, NXT UK.

After winning the 2018 Mae Young Classic, Toni Storm declared in her promo that she can challenge for any championship of her choosing. She went on to state that she wanted to face NXT UK Women's Champion Rhea Ripley. General Manager Johnny Saint granted her match and it was later revealed that Toni Storm would face Rhea Ripley for the title at TakeOver: Blackpool.

On the 2 January 2019 edition of NXT UK, Moustache Mountain defeated Gallus (Mark Coffey and Wolfgang) to advance in the finals of the NXT Tag Team Championship tournament. The team of Zack Gibson and James Drake defeated Flash Morgan Webster and Mark Andrews to also advance to the finals on the 9 January 2019 edition of NXT UK. At TakeOver: Blackpool, it was made official that Moustache Mountain would face Gibson and Drake for the inaugural NXT UK Tag Team Championships.  

On the 28 November edition of NXT UK, Joe Coffey, Mark Coffey and Wolfgang attacked Moustache Mountain (Tyler Bate and Trent Seven) after a match between Joe and Bate ended in a no-contest. Pete Dunne then attacked Joe and it was later revealed that Dunne would defend the WWE UK Championship against Joe. On the 2 January 2019 episode of NXT UK, a contract signing was held between the two with their championship match being made official for TakeOver: Blackpool.

On the 2 January 2019 edition of NXT UK, Dave Mastiff and Eddie Dennis fought to a no contest. Other officials and Sid Scala, assistant to General Manager Johnny Saint, failed to separate the two. This resulted in General Manager Johnny Saint announcing that at TakeOver: Blackpool, Dave Mastiff and Eddie Dennis would face each other in a No Disqualification match.

On the 9 January 2019 edition of NXT UK, a match between Travis Banks and Jordan Devlin was scheduled for TakeOver: Blackpool.

Event

Preliminary matches 
In the opening match, Moustache Mountain (Trent Seven and Tyler Bate) faced Zack Gibson and James Drake to determine the inaugural NXT UK Tag Team Champions. Drake and Gibson performed a "Ticket to Mayhem" on Seven to win the title. 

Next, Jordan Devlin was scheduled to face Travis Banks. Before the match, Banks performed a Suicide Dive on Devlin but Devlin threw Banks into the steel steps. After Banks was removed by officials, Assistant General Manager Sid Scala announced Devlin would compete, with his opponent revealed to be Finn Bálor. Bálor performed a "Coup De Grâce" on Devlin to win. 

After that, Eddie Dennis faced Dave Mastiff in a No-Disqualification match. Mastiff performed "Into The Void" through a table on Dennis to win. 

In the penultimate match, Rhea Ripley defended the NXT UK Women’s Championship against Toni Storm. Ripley performed a "Riptide" on Storm for a near-fall. Storm performed a "Storm Zero" on Ripley for a near-fall. Storm performed a second "Storm Zero" on Ripley to win the title.

Main event 
In the main event, Pete Dunne defended the WWE United Kingdom Championship against Joe Coffey. Dunne performed the "Bitter End" on Coffey for a near-fall. Coffey performed a Discus Clothesline on Dunne for a near-fall. Coffey performed a second Discus Clothesline and a third Discus Clothesline on the floor on Dunne. Coffey performed a Pumphandle Side Slam on Dunne for a near-fall. Dunne performed a second "Bitter End" on Coffey. Dunne performed a Discus Clothesline and a third "Bitter End" on Coffey for a near-fall. Dunne forced Coffey to submit to a Triangle Choke whilst executing a Finger Snap to retain the title. 

After the match, Walter made his NXT UK debut. Walter performed a Big Boot on Coffey before confronting Dunne as the event ended.

Aftermath
The 2019 TakeOver: Blackpool would be the first in a subseries of UK TakeOvers titled TakeOver: Blackpool and held at the Empress Ballroom. NXT UK TakeOver: Blackpool II was held the following year, also in January. This second Blackpool event, however, would be the last of only three UK TakeOvers held due to the COVID-19 pandemic in 2020.

Results

NXT UK Tag Team Championship tournament bracket

References

External links
 

Blackpool
2019 WWE Network events
January 2019 events in the United Kingdom
Blackpool
WWE international
2019 in England